Pachnephorus crocodilinus is a species of leaf beetle found in Sudan, Ethiopia, Nigeria, Cameroon, the Democratic Republic of the Congo, Tanzania, Namibia, Zambia, Malawi, Mozambique and South Africa, described by Stefano Zoia in 2007. Some specimens of the species from western Africa (Senegal, Ghana, Gabon and Mali) are also known, but with doubt. Its name is derived from the Latin crocodilus ("crocodile"), referring to both the species' type locality (Mfuwe Crocodile Farm, in South Luangwa National Park, Zambia) and the fact that Pachnephorus species, like crocodiles, usually live near water.

References

Eumolpinae
Beetles of the Democratic Republic of the Congo
Insects of Sudan
Insects of Ethiopia
Insects of West Africa
Insects of Cameroon
Insects of Tanzania
Insects of Namibia
Insects of Zambia
Insects of Malawi
Insects of Mozambique
Beetles described in 2007